The Riverland Historic District encompasses an early 20th century neighborhood on the south side of the Roanoke River in Roanoke, Virginia.  The area consists of a portion of the residential area bounded on the south by Walnut Avenue SE, on the east by Arbutus Avenue SE, and on other sides by the river.  Most of the included properties are either on Arbutus Avenue or Riverland Street, with some also on Piedmont Street and Walnut Avenue.  The neighborhood is one of closely spaced residential properties built to provide housing for workers in nearby businesses.  It was developed by the Highland Land Company, and was mostly built out between 1900 and 1930.

The district was listed on the National Register of Historic Places in 2013.

See also
National Register of Historic Places listings in Roanoke, Virginia

References

Historic districts on the National Register of Historic Places in Virginia
Buildings and structures in Roanoke, Virginia
National Register of Historic Places in Roanoke, Virginia